The Korean Mountain Preservation League, formerly the Korean Mountaineering League, is a non-profit non-governmental organization that focuses on the conservation of South Korea's mountain environments. It was founded in 2005 by Shawn James Morrissey, a mountaineer and author, who currently acts as the KMPL's president. The group is made up of Koreans and expatriates.

The KMPL's work includes: cleaning of littered trails and campsites; trail assessment; education of environmentally safe mountaineering practices; and campaigns against government legislation that will affect the mountain environments of Korea.

External links
Joong Ang Daily article
KBS radio interview

Environmental organizations based in South Korea
Nature conservation in South Korea
Society of South Korea
2005 establishments in South Korea
Organizations established in 2005